Melur taluk is a taluk of Madurai district of the Indian state of Tamil Nadu. The headquarters of the taluk is the town of Melur.

Demographics
According to the 2011 census, the taluk of Melur had a population of 290,985 with 146,499 males and 144,486 females. There were 986 women for every 1,000 men. The taluk had a literacy rate of 68.91%. Child population in the age group below 6 years were 16,258 Males and 14,540 Females.

References 

Taluks of Madurai district